"Need You Now" is a song by Australian singer-songwriter Dean Lewis, released on 7 April 2017 by Island Records Australia and Universal Music Australia as the second single from his debut extended play Same Kind of Different (2017).

The song was certified gold in Australia in February 2018, before being certified Platinum in 2019.

An acoustic version was released on 30 June 2017.

Music video
The music video for "Need You Now" was directed by Mick Jones and released on 27 April 2017. The video charts a man's inner demons, addiction problems and continual self-destruction. Lewis explained to MusicFeeds: "Instead of the video being a direct reflection of the lyrics, we came up with this dark idea of this guy who is keeping everything together on the surface but on weekends he loses himself. I have seen a lot of friends who have gone through that, so it's close to home for me."

Track listing

Charts

Certifications

Release history

References

2017 singles
2017 songs
Dean Lewis songs
Universal Music Australia singles
Songs written by Dean Lewis